The 2009 Women's Hockey Junior World Cup was the sixth tournament of the Women's Hockey Junior World Cup. It was held from August 3 to August 16, 2009 in Boston, United States.

The Netherlands won the tournament for the second time after defeating Argentina 3–0 in the final. Defending champions South Korea won the third-place match by defeating England 2–1.

Qualification
Each continental federation got a number of quotas depending on the FIH World Rankings for teams qualified through their junior continental championships. Along with the host nation, 16 teams competed in the tournament.

 – Egypt withdrew from participating. As the first reserve team was previously assigned to the European Federation, France took their place as winners of the 2012 EuroHockey Junior Nations Trophy.
 – Australia and New Zealand qualified automatically due to the lack of other competing teams in the Oceania qualifier.

Squads

Results
All times are Eastern Daylight Time (UTC−04:00)

Preliminary round

Pool A

Pool B

Pool C

Pool D

Medal round

Pool E

Pool F

Non-medal round

Pool G

Fifth to sixteenth place classification

Fifteenth and sixteenth place

Thirteenth and fourteenth place

Eleventh and twelfth place

Ninth and tenth place

Seventh and eighth place

Fifth and sixth place

First to fourth place classification

Semifinals

Third and fourth place

Final

Awards

Statistics

Final ranking

Goalscorers

References

External links
Official FIH website
Official website

 
2009
August  sports events in the United States
 in American women's sports
2009 Women's Hockey Junior World Cup
 in women's field hockey
 in youth sport
Ice hockey competitions in Boston
 in Boston
 in sports in Massachusetts
Women's sports in Massachusetts